Hernán "Pancho" Emilio Jasen Cicarelli (born February 4, 1978) is an Argentine-Italian retired professional basketball player. Born  in Bahía Blanca, Argentina, and standing at a height of 6'6 " (1.99 m) tall, he played mainly at the small forward position, but he could also play at the shooting guard position.

Professional career
Jasen joined Andino La Rioja of the Argentine League in 1995. He then moved to the Argentine club Estudiantes de Bahía Blanca in 1996. He moved to the Spanish League team Gijón Baloncesto in 1999.

In 2001, he then joined the Spanish club Estudiantes, whom he also played with in the Euroleague and the Eurocup competitions. He was later named the captain of Estudiantes. In 2011, he moved to the Spanish club Cajasol.

National team career
Jasen won the 1996 South American U-18 Championship with Argentina's junior national team. He won the silver medal at the 1999 South American Championship. He also played for the silver-medal winning senior Argentine national basketball team at the 2005 FIBA Americas Championship.

He also won the bronze medal at the 2006 South American Championship, before a four-year hiatus from the national team. Jasen was again called to the national team for the 2010 FIBA World Championship. With Argentina leading by one point in its first game during the tournament, he had a key steal against Germany's Demond Greene, with ten seconds left in the game, to help preserve the team's victory.

He won the gold medal at the 2011 FIBA Americas Championship.

EuroLeague statistics

|-
| style="text-align:left;"| 2004–05
| style="text-align:left;"| Adecco Estudiantes
| 13 || 10 || 23.3 || .421 || .226 || .689 || 5.5 || 2.1 || 1.2 || .4 || 10.7 || 12.1
|- class="sortbottom"
| style="text-align:left;"| Career
| style="text-align:left;"|
| 13 || 10 || 23.3 || .421 || .226 || .689 || 5.5 || 2.1 || 1.2 || .4 || 10.7 || 12.1

Awards and accomplishments

Argentine national team
1996 South American U-18 Championship: 
1999 South American Championship: 
2005 Stanković Continental Champions' Cup: 
2005 FIBA Americas Championship: 
2006 South American Championship: 
2011 FIBA Americas Championship:

Club team
 Number 5 retired by Estudiantes de Bahía Blanca in 2018

References

External links
Euroleague.net Profile
FIBA Profile
FIBA Europe Profile
Eurobasket.com Profile
Spanish League Profile 

1978 births
Living people
2010 FIBA World Championship players
Argentine expatriate basketball people in Spain
Argentine men's basketball players
Argentine people of Italian descent
Basketball players at the 2012 Summer Olympics
CB Estudiantes players
Estudiantes de Bahía Blanca basketball players
Gijón Baloncesto players
Italian expatriate basketball people in Spain
Italian men's basketball players
Liga ACB players
Olympic basketball players of Argentina
Real Betis Baloncesto players
Shooting guards
Small forwards
Sportspeople from Bahía Blanca